Juan Antonio Fernández Segui (born July 18, 1947) is a Spanish fitness coach and manager. He was the manager of C.D. FAS and Burgos CF.

External links

1947 births
Living people
Sportspeople from Madrid
Spanish football managers
Expatriate football managers in El Salvador
C.D. FAS managers